Bistupur is a village in Nalbari district of Western Assam. It is located at north bank of river Brahmaputra.

Culture

Language 
The Nalbariya dialect of the Assamese language,  is spoken in Bistupur.

Festivals 
Domahi, Amati, Durga Puja, Kali Puja (Shyama Puja), Diwali, Holi, Janmastami, Shivratri etc. are major festivals of the village.

Transport 
The village is located north of Nalbari town, is well connected to Nalbari town and National Highway 27 by buses and other modes of transport. Railway station serving the village is Nalbari railway station and is connected by air through Gauhati International Airport.

See also 
 Barpipalia
 Nahira

References

External links 
 

Villages in Nalbari district
Lower Assam